Rajasthan Patrika is an Indian Hindi-language daily newspaper. It was founded by Karpoor Chandra Kulish in 1956 and published as Rajasthan Patrika in Delhi and Rajasthan, and as Patrika in 9 other states.

As per Indian Readership Survey 2013, Rajasthan Patrika emerged as the fourth most-read Hindi language newspaper in India, and Patrika emerged sixth.

History
Rajasthan Patrika was founded by Karpoor Chandra Kulish on 7 March 1956. Mr. Karpoor Chand Kulish is follower of Jain religion. Over the years, it became a leading national daily.

Editions

Rajasthan Patrika prints editions in New Delhi and the seven cities of Chhattisgarh (in Bilaspur, Jagdalpur and Raipur), Gujarat (in Ahmedabad and Surat), Karnataka (in Bangalore and Hubli), Madhya Pradesh (under the shorter name of Patrika in Bhopal, Gwalior, Indore, Jabalpur, Ujjain and eight other cities), Rajasthan in (Jaipur, Jodhpur, Kota, Gangapur City and 13 other cities) and in Tamil Nadu (at Chennai and Coimbatore).

Early in 2015, Rajasthan Patrika announced a Delhi-based English news website, called Catch News under the aegis of senior journalist and editor Shoma Chaudhry.Rajasthan Patrika also publish two bimonthly Hindi language child magazines — "Balhans" and "Chotu-Motu".

Criticism 
Patrika has been criticised for non-implementation of Majithia Wage Board's recommendations for hiking wages of employees of newspapers, several cases have been lodged in various high courts of states in India and even in Supreme Court of India.

Social awareness activities
Amritam Jalam: The campaign focuses on saving water through restoration and renovation of neglected and derelict water bodies.

Awards given by Patrika

Karpoor Chandra Kulish International Journalism Award

In 2007, Rajasthan Patrika instituted the Karpoor Chandra Kulish International Journalism Award in the memory of Karpoor Chand Kulish, the founder editor. This annual international award carries prize money of US$11,000 and a trophy. The award is aimed at recognizing efforts of thought leaders in media, journalist's outstanding contributions to upholding professional values as well as protecting and promoting ethics and morality, right and freedom of the people for better quality of life. Dawn Pakistan and Hindustan Times Delhi were jointly given the inaugural award in New Delhi on 12 March 2008.

Concerned Communicator Award

As a part of its CSR initiatives and social partnering for a better world, Rajasthan Patrika instituted the Concerned Communicator Award in 1997.  The winner is awarded a cash prize of US$11,000 and a certificate.

Achievements

India's First News site on IDN domain (पत्रिका.भारत)

Notable columnist 
S. Gurumurthy
Feroze Varun Gandhi

See also
 The Hindu
 List of newspapers in India by circulation
 List of newspapers in the world by circulation

References

External links
  

Mass media in Rajasthan
Hindi-language newspapers
Publications established in 1956
Newspapers published in Delhi
Newspapers published in Kolkata
Newspapers published in Chennai
Newspapers published in Bangalore
1956 establishments in Rajasthan
Newspapers owned by Patrika Group